Mokriyan-e Shomali Rural District is in the Central District of Miandoab County, West Azerbaijan province, Iran. At the National Census of 2006, its population was 14,952 in 3,281 households. There were 15,044 inhabitants in 4,241 households at the following census of 2011. At the most recent census of 2016, the population of the rural district was 15,081 in 4,572 households. The largest of its 52 villages was Hajji Hasan, with 1,323 people.

References 

Miandoab County

Rural Districts of West Azerbaijan Province

Populated places in West Azerbaijan Province

Populated places in Miandoab County